Edgardo Bruna del Campo (8 February 1947 – 19 March 2017) was a Chilean actor, musician, theater director, and social activist, recognized for his long career in various productions and plays.

Biography
Thanks to a scholarship, he traveled to the United States to perfect his skills in dramatic arts at the University of California, Berkeley, home of the hippie movement in the late 1960s. He decided to return to Chile in 1971 to be present in the government of President Salvador Allende. Later, after the 1973 coup d'état, he left for Mexico, where he lived for five years.

The group won the folkloric competition of the 1966 Viña del Mar International Song Festival with the song "La burrerita".

He made his television debut in 1984 on the Channel 13 telenovela Los títeres. During the 1990s he joined the dramatic area of TVN, and later worked for Chilevisión and Mega.

He was president of the Union of Actors and Actresses of Chile (Sidarte), president of the National Union of Artists, and counselor of Chileactores. In 2013 he was a candidate for regional councilor representing the Progressive Party for the Santiago Metropolitan Region. However, he was not elected.

He died on 19 March 2017 at age 70, after suffering a heart attack at home at 4:00 p.m. On 22 March, the Senate of Chile paid tribute to him for his work in the actors' union and his active participation in the preparation of the project which created the Ministry of Science and Technology.

Filmography

Films
 ¡Viva el novio! (1990)
 Dos mujeres en la ciudad (1990) – Professor
 Amelia Lópes O'Neill (1991)
 El seductor (2004) – Catar
 El socio (2004) – Walter Davis
 Las golondrinas del altazor (2006)
 The Black Pimpernel (2007) – Hotel proprietor
 Oculto en la oscuridad (2007) – Father of Mariana
  (2009) – Federico Wilms
 La lección de pintura (2011) – Bechard
 Aftershock (2012) – Grumpy operator
 El vuelo de los cuervos (2013) – Don Efraín
 El árbol magnético (2013) – Tata
 El inquisidor (2015) – Gaspar
 Pinochet boys (2016) 
 You'll Never Be Alone (2016) – Bruno

Telenovelas

TV series and specials

Music videos

Theater
 La Celestina (1982) – director

References

External links
 

1947 births
2017 deaths
Chilean male film actors
Chilean male stage actors
Chilean male telenovela actors
Chilean theatre directors
Male actors from Santiago
Musicians from Santiago
Politicians from Santiago
University of California, Berkeley alumni
University of Chile alumni